John Driggs may refer to:

 John B. Driggs (1852–1914), American physician, teacher, and recorder of native folktales in Northwest Alaska
 John D. Driggs (1927–2014), American politician, mayor of Phoenix, Arizona
 John F. Driggs (1813–1877), American politician from Michigan